Black ice, sometimes called clear ice, is a thin coating of glaze ice on a surface, especially on streets. The ice itself is not black, but visually transparent, allowing the often black road below to be seen through it. The typically low levels of noticeable ice pellets, snow, or sleet surrounding black ice means that areas of the ice are often practically invisible to drivers or people stepping on it. There is, thus, a risk of slippage and subsequent accident due to the unexpected loss of traction.

Definitions 
The term "black ice" in the United States is defined by the National Weather Service  as "patchy ice on roadways or other transportation surfaces that cannot easily be seen.  It is often clear (not white) with the black road surface visible underneath. It is most prevalent during the early morning hours, especially after snowmelt on the roadways has a chance to refreeze overnight when the temperature drops below freezing. Black ice can also form when roadways are slick from rain and temperatures drop below freezing overnight."

The World Meteorological Organization definitions of black ice are:

A popular alternative for the term "glaze". A thin sheet of ice, relatively dark in appearance, may form when light rain or drizzle falls on a road surface that is at a temperature below 0 °C or, alternatively, when water already on the road surface subsequently freezes when its temperature falls below freezing point. It may also be formed when supercooled fog droplets are intercepted by buildings, fences, and vegetation.
Thin, new ice on freshwater or saltwater, appearing dark in color because of its transparency, a result of its columnar grain structure. On lakes, black ice is also commonly overlain by white ice formed from refrozen snow or slush.

Formation

On roads and pavements
The American Meteorological Society Glossary of Meteorology includes the definition of black ice as "a thin sheet of ice, relatively dark in appearance, [that] may form when light rain or drizzle falls on a road surface that is at a temperature below ." Because it represents only a thin accumulation, black ice is highly transparent and thus difficult to see compared with snow, frozen slush, or thicker ice layers. In addition, it is often interleaved with wet pavement, which is nearly identical in appearance. This condition makes driving, cycling or walking on affected surfaces extremely dangerous. Other compounds such as magnesium chloride or calcium chloride have been used for extremely cold temperatures since the freezing-point depression of their solutions is lower.

At low temperatures (below ), black ice can form on roadways when the moisture from automobile exhaust, such as motorcycles and cars, condenses on the road surface.  
Such conditions caused multiple accidents in Minnesota when the temperatures dipped below  for a prolonged period of time in mid-December 2008.  Salt's ineffectiveness at melting ice at these temperatures compounds the problem. Black ice may form even when the ambient temperature is several degrees above the freezing point of water , if the air warms suddenly after a prolonged cold spell that has left the surface of the roadway well below the freezing point of water.

On December 1, 2013, heavy post-Thanksgiving weekend traffic encountered black ice on the westbound I-290 expressway in Worcester, Massachusetts. A chain reaction series of crashes resulted, involving three tractor-trailers and over 60 other vehicles. The ice formed suddenly on a long downward slope, surprising drivers coming over the crest of a hill, who could not see crashed vehicles ahead until it was too late to stop on the slick pavement.

On February 11, 2021, icing in Dallas and Fort Worth, Texas, contributed to a crash on I-35W which authorities called a "mass casualty event".  Over 100 cars were involved in the pileup and multiple fatalities were reported.

On bridges

Bridges and overpasses can be especially dangerous. Black ice forms first on bridges and overpasses because air can circulate both above and below the surface of the elevated roadway when the ambient temperature drops, causing the pavement temperature on the bridge to fall rapidly. In the United States, road warning signs with the advisory "Bridge Ices Before Road" indicate potentially dangerous roadways above bridge structures.

Similar road signs exists throughout Canada, but warnings sometimes appear without words to comply to bilingual requirements. The Canadian sign features a vehicle with skid marks and snow flakes. The same sign's official and undisclosed description is defined as "Pavement is slippery when wet".

Case study in Minnesota

The I-35W Mississippi River bridge in Minneapolis, Minnesota, was well known for its black ice before it collapsed in 2007 into the Mississippi River. It had caused several pileups during its 40-year life. On December 19, 1985, the temperature reached . Cars crossing the bridge experienced black ice and there was a massive pile up of crashed vehicles on the bridge on the northbound side. In February and in December 1996, the bridge was identified as the single most treacherous cold-weather spot in the local freeway system, because of the almost frictionless thin layer of black ice that regularly formed when temperatures dropped below freezing. The bridge's proximity to Saint Anthony Falls contributed significantly to the icing problem and the site was noted for frequent spinouts and collisions.

By January 1999, Mn/DOT began testing magnesium chloride solutions and a mixture of magnesium chloride and a corn-processing byproduct to see whether either would reduce the black ice that appeared on the bridge during the winter months. In October 1999, the state embedded temperature-activated nozzles in the bridge deck to spray the bridge with potassium acetate solution to keep the area free of winter black ice. The system came into operation in 2000.

On water

When the temperature is below freezing and the wind is calm, such as under a high atmospheric pressure at night in the fall, a thin layer of ice will form over open water of a lake. If the depth of the body of water is large enough, its color is black and can be seen through the ice, thus the name black ice.

Ice can also be formed by seawater spray and water vapour freezing upon contact with a vessel's superstructure when temperature is low enough. Ice formed in this manner is known as rime. As the formation progress, the aboveboard weight of the vessel increases and may ultimately cause capsizing. Furthermore, rime ice may impede the correct functioning of important navigational instruments on board, such as radar or radio installations. Different strategies for the removal of such ice are employed: chipping away the ice or even using fire hoses in an attempt to remove the ice.

In mountains

Black ice is a significant hazard for climbers and scramblers. Cold weather is common at high altitudes, and black ice quickly forms on rock surfaces. Loss of traction is as sudden and unexpected as on a pavement or road, but can be dangerous if the rock is in an exposed position with a drop below. An ice-axe and crampons are essential use in such circumstances as they will help to prevent a fall, and a belay rope will help to arrest a fall.

See also

Clear ice
Congelation ice
Freezing rain
Jumble ice
Road traffic accident
Sand

References

External links

 Is there really such a thing as black ice?, from the Straight Dope staff

Snow or ice weather phenomena
Water ice
Precipitation
Weather hazards
Road hazards

eu:Euri izoztua